CounterPunch is a 2017 documentary film directed by Jay Bulger following three fighters at different stages of their career chasing their goals of becoming champions.

The film was released by Netflix on June 6, 2017.

Premise
CounterPunch is an authentic documentary about boxing, covering both the good and the bad aspects of the sport, and follows the personal growth and development of its main characters, Chis "Lil B Hop" Colbert, Cam F. Awesome, and Peter "Kid Chocolate" Quillan. The film also features commentary from established boxers like Sugar Ray Leonard, Oscar De La Hoya, Paulie Malignaggi and others.

Cast
 Oscar De La Hoya
 David Diamante
 Bernard Hopkins
 Sugar Ray Leonard
 Paulie Malignaggi
 Michael Woods
 Chris "Lil B Hop" Colbert 
 Cam F. Awesome
 Peter "Kid Chocolate" Quillan

References

External links
 
 

2017 documentary films
2017 films
Netflix original documentary films
2010s English-language films